LSE may refer to:

Computing 
 LSE (programming language), a computer programming language
 LSE, Latent sector error, a media assessment measure related to the hard disk drive storage technology
 Language-Sensitive Editor, a text editor used on Digital Equipment Corporation's VMS operating system

Education 
 Lahore School of Economics, a private university in Lahore, Punjab, Pakistan
 Lincoln Southeast High School, a public government education school located in Lincoln, Nebraska
 London School of Economics and Political Science, a public research university within the University of London
 Louvain School of Engineering, faculty of engineering science at the University of Louvain (UCLouvain), Belgium

Finance 
 Lahore Stock Exchange, now Pakistan Stock Exchange
 London Stock Exchange
 London Stock Exchange Group, the owner group of the London Stock Exchange

Transport 
 La Crosse Regional Airport, Wisconsin, United States (IATA code LSE)
 Luzern–Stans–Engelberg railway line, a mountain railway in Switzerland

Other uses 
 Load serving entity, an electricity demand aggregator in the deregulated market.
 Landing ship, Emergency Repair, a US WW2 Navy ship
 Least-squares estimation, a statistical technique commonly used in data fitting
 Lengua de signos española, Spanish Sign Language
 Logical Sensory Extrovert, a socionics personality type